Uganda – United States relations are bilateral diplomatic, economic, social and political relations between Uganda and the United States.

According to the 2012 U.S. Global Leadership Report, 79% of Ugandans approve of U.S. leadership, with 11% disapproving and 10% uncertain.

Overview
Although U.S.–Ugandan relations were strained during the rule of Idi Amin in the 1970s, relations improved after Amin's fall. In mid-1979, the United States reopened its embassy in Kampala. Relations with successor governments were cordial, although Milton Obote and his administration rejected strong U.S. criticism of Uganda's human rights situation.

Bilateral relations between the United States and Uganda have been good since Museveni assumed power, and the United States has welcomed his efforts to end human rights abuses and to pursue economic reform. Uganda is a strong supporter of the Global War on Terror. The United States is helping Uganda achieve export-led economic growth through the African Growth and Opportunity Act and provides a significant amount of development assistance. At the same time, the United States is concerned about continuing human rights problems and the pace of progress toward the establishment of genuine political pluralism.

U.S. development assistance in Uganda has the overall goal of reducing mass poverty. Most U.S. program assistance is focused in the areas of health, education, and agriculture. Both the U.S. Agency for International Development (USAID) and the Centers for Disease Control (CDC) have major programs to fight the HIV/AIDS pandemic. Other programs promote trade and investment, curb environmental degradation, encourage the peaceful resolution of local and international conflicts, and promote honest and open government. The United States also provides large amounts of humanitarian assistance to populations without access to adequate food supplies because of conflict, drought and other factors.

U.S. Peace Corps Volunteers are active in primary teacher training and HIV/AIDS programs. The Department of State carries out cultural exchange programs, brings Fulbright lecturers and researchers to Uganda, and sponsors U.S. study and tour programs for a wide variety of officials from government, non-governmental organizations and the private sector. Through Ambassador's Self-Help Fund, local groups in poor areas receive assistance for small projects with a high level of community involvement.

U.S.-Ugandan relations also benefit from significant contributions to health care, nutrition, education, and park systems from U.S. missionaries, non-governmental organizations, private universities, HIV/AIDS researchers, and wildlife organizations. Expatriate Ugandans living in the U.S. also promote stronger links between the two countries. Relations have since improved under the Donald Trump administration.

Principal U.S. Officials include Ambassador Scott H. DeLisi, Deputy Chief of Mission Patricia Mahoney, Public Affairs Officer Daniel Travis, and USAID Director Leslie Reed.

The U.S. maintains an embassy in Kampala, Uganda.

Relations between the two countries have recently been shaken when, on June 19, 2014, the Obama administration cut funding to Uganda in addition to canceling a planned military exercise with their armed forces in response to Uganda's outlawing of homosexuality that February, which had already been met with worldwide condemnation, especially from the Western world.  On June 20, the Ugandan government accused the U.S. of "blackmail".

See also
 Ugandan Americans
 Foreign relations of Uganda
 Foreign relations of the United States
Southeast Africans in the United States

References

Further reading
 Miller, Olivia. "Ugandan Americans." Gale Encyclopedia of Multicultural America, edited by Thomas Riggs, (3rd ed., vol. 4, Gale, 2014), pp. 449–458. online

External links
History of Uganda - U.S. relations

 
Uganda
United States